Malibu Pier (foaled April 2, 2007 in Kentucky) is an American Thoroughbred filly.
Owned by Spendthrift Farm LLC  and trained by Carla Gaines, she won the Santa Ana Stakes, the Santa Barbara Handicap and the Beverly Hills Handicap.

She was sired by Malibu Moon. She is out of Blue Moon.

2010 season

On July 15, 2010,Malibu Pier won her first race, a 6 furlongs maiden race. She was ridden by Rafael Bejarano. She raced on turf and she defeated 5 other horses.

On August 14, 2010, Malibu Pier won her second race 1 mile Allowance Optional Claiming race with Rafael Bejarano. This time she defeated bigger field, with 8 other fillies.

In the field of 10 other fillies Malibu Pier finished in 4th place in Harold C. Ramser Sr. Handicap on October 17, 2010.

Malibu Pier came back with 1 1/16 miles on all weather track win i nAllowance race. She meet the small field and finished the race in 1:43:44.

On December 26, 2010,Malibu Pier finished 2nd to Switch in the 7 furlongs Grade 1 race La Brea Stakes. She was ridden by Garrett Gomez.

2011 season

On January 26, 2011, Malibu Pier finished last in an El Encino Stakes with 5 fillies in the field. Her jockey was Garrett Gomez.

Malibu Pier came back on turf, when she finished 3rd in Buena Vista Handicap on February 21, 2011 to Cozi Rosie.

March 19, 2011, was a day when Malibu Pier come back with a win in the Grade 2 Santa Ana Stakes, where she defeated fillies and mares going 1 1/8 miles on turf with Rafael Bejarano.

On April 16, 2011, Malibu Pier won the 1 1/4 miles long Santa Barbara Handicap defeating Cozi Rosie and other fillies and mares.

On May 30, 2011, Malibu Pier finished 5th as a favourite Grade 1 Gamely Stakes, going 1 1/8 miles on turf. She was ridden by Brice Blanc .

On June 26, 2011, Malibu Pier returned impressively with her Grade 3 Beverly Hills Handicap win. She won over Cozi Rosie and 2 other fillies.

Career statistics

Pedigree

2007 racehorse births
2013 racehorse deaths
Racehorses bred in Kentucky
Racehorses trained in the United States
Thoroughbred family 16-a